Glyptoscelimorpha is a genus of beetles in the family Schizopodidae, containing the following species:

 Glyptoscelimorpha juniperae (Knull, 1940)
 Glyptoscelimorpha marmorata Horn, 1893
 Glyptoscelimorpha viridis Chamberlin, 1931

References

Schizopodidae
Buprestoidea genera